Birkenes is a municipality in Agder county, Norway. It is located in the traditional district of Sørlandet. The administrative centre of the municipality is the village of Birkeland, where about half the municipal population lives. Other villages in Birkenes include Ås, Engesland, Flakk, Håbbesland, Herefoss, Mollestad, Oggevatn, Rugsland, Senumstad, Søre Herefoss, Svaland, Tveide, and Væting.

The  municipality is the 183rd largest by area out of the 356 municipalities in Norway. Birkenes is the 174th most populous municipality in Norway with a population of 5,342.

General information

Name
The municipality (originally the parish) is named after the old Birkenes farm, since the first Birkenes Church was built there. The first element is birki which means "birch wood" and the last element is nes which means "headland". This farm is located on the south side of what is now the village of Mollestad.

Coat of arms
The coat of arms was granted on 5 December 1986. The official blazon is "Vert, a birch branch with three leaves argent issuant from the base". This means the arms have a green field (background) and the charge is a birch tree branch with three leaves. The branch and leaves have a tincture of argent which means it is commonly colored white, but if it is made out of metal, then silver is used. The green color in the field symbolizes the importance of agriculture in the municipality. The arms are a canting of the Norwegian word  which means birch (it is canting since bjørk is similar to "birk-" in the name Birkenes). The three leaves symbolize the three main areas in the municipality: Birkenes in the south, Herefoss in the northeast, and Vegusdal in the northwest. The arms were designed by Daniel Rike who based it off an idea by Knut Øvensen.

Churches
The Church of Norway has three parishes within the municipality of Birkenes. It is part of the Vest-Nedenes prosti (deanery) in the Diocese of Agder og Telemark.

History
The historic parish of Tveit had to be divided into two formannskapsdistrikts on 1 January 1838 because the main part of Tveit belonged to the county of Lister og Mandal and the annex of Birkenæs belonged to the county of Nedenæs and the new law said a municipality could only exist in one county, not two. Therefore, the parish was split and Birkenæs municipality was created in Nedenæs county. On 1 January 1883, an uninhabited part of Birkenes was transferred to the control of neighboring Landvik municipality.	

Starting in the 1960s, Norway enacted many municipal reforms such as mergers and border adjustments stemming from the work of the Schei Committee. On 1 January 1967, the neighboring municipalities of Herefoss (population: 585) and Vegusdal (population: 582) were merged into the municipality of Birkenes, creating a much larger municipality with a population of 3,050.

On 1 January 1970, two uninhabited areas of Neset and Råbudal in the neighboring municipality of Froland were transferred to Birkenes (these areas were formerly in the municipality of Mykland prior to 1967). On 1 January 1979, the uninhabited area of Landheia in Froland was transferred to the control of Birkenes municipality. Later, on 1 January 1986, the Lislevand farm area (population: 8) was transferred from Birkenes to the neighboring municipality of Evje og Hornnes. Then on 1 January 1991, the Dalen area of Birkenes (population: 60) was transferred to the neighboring municipality of Froland.  On 1 January 2019, the Hovlandsdalen area (population: 27) was transferred from Birkenes municipality to the neighboring Evje og Hornnes municipality.

Geography
The municipality borders Kristiansand, Vennesla, Iveland, Evje og Hornnes, Froland, Grimstad, and Lillesand municipalities.

Birkenes is home to many lakes, including Herefossfjorden, Nystølfjorden, Ogge, and Uldalsåna. The river Tovdalselva runs through the municipality as well.

Government
All municipalities in Norway, including Birkenes, are responsible for primary education (through 10th grade), outpatient health services, senior citizen services, unemployment and other social services, zoning, economic development, and municipal roads. The municipality is governed by a municipal council of elected representatives, which in turn elect a mayor.  The municipality falls under the Agder District Court and the Agder Court of Appeal.

Municipal council
The municipal council of Birkenes is made up of 21 representatives that are elected to four year terms. Currently, the party breakdown is as follows:

Economy
Agriculture and logging are important sources of employment, but the municipality also has a small industrial base with about 400 different work sites. The largest enterprise is Owens Corning with approximately 180 employees. Other larger businesses include Uldal Vinduer og Dører, Foss Bad, Scanflex, KOAB Industrier, and Birkeland Trykkeri.

Transportation
The Sørland Line provides rail service at Herefoss Station. Prior to 1953, the Lillesand-Flaksvand Line also served Birkenes, but that railway line was closed down and removed.

Norwegian National Road 41 runs north–south through Birkenes, and is one of the main highways in this area of Norway. There are also several other important county roads in Birkenes, such as Norwegian County Road 404, Norwegian County Road 405, and Norwegian County Road 406.

Notable people 
 Kåre Kolberg (1936 in Birkenes – 2014) a Norwegian composer, organist and music critic
 Gunhild Hagestad (born 1942 in Birkenes) a retired Norwegian sociologist and academic
 Gunn Margit Andreassen (born 1973) a former Norwegian biathlete, team bronze medallist in the 1998 Winter Olympics and team silver medallist at the 2002 Winter Olympics, lives in Birkenes
 Trude Harstad (born 1974 in Birkenes) a former Norwegian biathlete

References

External links

Municipal fact sheet from Statistics Norway 

 Welcome to Birkenes - Tourist information
Kultur i Birkenes på kart from Kulturnett.no 

 
Kristiansand region
Municipalities of Agder
1838 establishments in Norway